Wyszomierz may refer to the following places:
Wyszomierz, Gmina Bielany in Masovian Voivodeship (east-central Poland)
Wyszomierz, Gmina Kosów Lacki in Masovian Voivodeship (east-central Poland)
Wyszomierz, West Pomeranian Voivodeship (north-west Poland)